Hetuan is a town in Panji District, Huainan, Anhui. , it administers the following fourteen villages:
Hetuan Village
Qinwan Village
Tangji Village
Yangci Village
Shiwei Village
Junliu Village
Tangdong Village
Tangxi Village
Gulugang Village
Chenni Village
Lizhuang Village
Jiazhuang Village
Yangyuan Village
Zhuji Village

References

Panji District
Township-level divisions of Anhui